X is the 24th letter of the Latin alphabet.

X may also refer to:

Art, entertainment, and media

Fictional entities 
 X (Dark Horse Comics), a character and series
 X (Mega Man), the main protagonist of the Mega Man X video game series
 X (The X-Files), a television series character
 Radio X, the fictional radio station broadcasting the  Grand Theft Auto: San Andreas soundtrack
 X, a symbol used on treasure maps in fiction to show the location of the hidden treasure
 X Parasite, a central subject of the 2002 game Metroid Fusion for the Game Boy Advance

Film 
 X (1963 film), subtitled The Man with the X-Ray Eyes, an American science-fiction film
 X (1986 film), a Norwegian film directed by Oddvar Einarson
 X (1996 film), an anime film directed by Rintaro
 X (2022 film), an American-Canadian horror film distributed by A24
 X the Unknown, a 1956 British film
 X-Paroni, a 1964 Finnish comedy film by Spede Pasanen
 Malcolm X (1992 film), a film by Spike Lee promoted with the alternate title X
 The X, a 2001 film by American director Peter Hewitt
 X: Night of Vengeance, a 2011 film by Australian director Jon Hewitt
 X: Past Is Present, a 2015 Indian anthology film
 X rating, used to classify films suitable for an adult-only audience

Television
 Kamen Rider X, a Japanese series and part of the Kamen Rider franchise
 Ultraman X, a 2015 Japanese tokusatsu television series
 The X (TV series), a Canadian children's program
 The X's, an American animated series
 WXSP-CD, a Grand Rapids, Michigan TV station branded as "The X"
 X (TV series), a Japanese anime series
 X, the production code for the 1966 Doctor Who serial The Ark

Video games 
 X (1992 video game) a 3D game for Nintendo's Game Boy console
 X (game series), a science fiction space simulator series by Egosoft
 X (Xbox show), an annual trade show hosted by Microsoft to showcase Xbox merchandise
 Mega Man X, a series of action-platform video games released by Capcom
 Mega Man X (video game), the first game in the series
 Pokémon X, one of the two paired Pokémon X and Y games for the Nintendo 3DS

Literature 
 X (Cage book), subtitled Writings ’79–’82, by avant garde composer John Cage
 X (magazine), a quarterly review of literature and the arts
 X (manga), a 1992 Japanese manga, anime film, and anime television series
 X (Grafton novel), 2015, by Sue Grafton
 X (young adult novel), 2015, by Ilyasah Shabazz and Kekla Magoon
 X: A Fabulous Child's Story, a 1972 short story and 1978 picture book by Lois Gould
 X: Or, Betty Shabazz v. The Nation, a 2017 play by Marcus Gardley
 'X' Stands for Unknown, a 1084 collection of nonfiction science essays by Isaac Asimov

Music

Performers

 X (American band), a punk band
 X (Australian band), a punk band
 X Japan, Japanese metal band, originally named X from 1982–1992

Albums
X (Agnez Mo album), 2017
 X (Klaus Schulze album), 1978
 X (Gnags album), 1983
 X (INXS album), 1990
 X (K-Ci & JoJo album), 2000
 X (Def Leppard album), 2002
 X (Anna Vissi album), 2002
 X (Kristeen Young album), 2004
 X the album, Christian compilation album series starting in 2004
 X (Liberty X album), 2005
 X (Intocable album), 2005
 X (Fourplay album), 2006
 X (Kylie Minogue album), 2007
 X (Trace Adkins album), 2008
 X (Spock's Beard album), 2010
 X (Royal Hunt album), 2010
 X (Roll Deep album), 2012
 X (The 69 Eyes album), 2012
 X (Chris Brown album), 2014
 X (Ed Sheeran album) (read as "Multiply"), 2014
X (The Driver Era album), 2019
X (Ken Carson album), 2022
 X (Lucki mixtape), 2015
 X, a Philippine hip-hop album by Ex Battalion
 X (Nonpoint album), 2018
 X: The Godless Void and Other Stories, 2020 by ...And You Will Know Us by the Trail of Dead
 Ten (Sault album), (also styled X) 2022

Operas
 X, The Life and Times of Malcolm X, 1986

Songs
 "X" (21 Savage and Metro Boomin song)
 "X" (Chris Brown song)
 "X" (Jonas Brothers and Karol G song)
 "X" (Liberty X song)
 "X" (Nicky Jam and J Balvin song)
 "X" (Poppy song)
 "X" (Xzibit song)
 "X", a song from the album The Circle by B'z
 "X", a song from the album Neysluvara by Hatari
 "X", a song from the album Undeniable by Hellyeah
 "X", a song from the album Pain Is Love by Ja Rule featuring Missy Elliott and Tweet
 "X", a song from the album Future History by Jason Derulo
 "X", a song from the album Luv Is Rage 2 by Lil Uzi Vert
 "X", a song from the album The Magic Position by Patrick Wolf
 "X", a song from the album Angels & Demons by Peter Andre
 "X", a song from the album Black Panther by ScHoolboy Q, 2 Chainz, Saudi, and Kendrick Lamar
 "X", a song from the album Toxicity by System of a Down
 "X", a song from the album Blue Blood by X Japan

Stations
 KHTI, formerly KCXX, known as "The 'X' at 103.9 FM", a rock n' roll radio station in the Inland Empire, Southern California
 KWEE, formerly known as "The 'X' at 100.1 FM", a rock n' roll radio station in Reno, Nevada
 WNFZ, also known as "94.3 the X", a modern rock radio station in Knoxville, Tennessee
 WQXA, also known as 105.7 "The 'X'", a modern rock radio station in Harrisburg, Pennsylvania
 WXDX-FM, also known as "The 'X' at 105.9", a modern rock radio station in Pittsburgh, Pennsylvania
 WXLV (FM), former call sign branded as "90.3 "The X"", a college radio station in Allentown, Pennsylvania
 WXLP - The X
 WXNY-FM, known as "La X 96.3", a Spanish radio station in New York City
 WZDA, formerly known as "103.9 The 'X'", a modern rock radio station in Dayton, Ohio

Roller coasters
 X2 (roller coaster), at Six Flags Magic Mountain, formerly known as X
 X (roller coaster), in Thorpe Park, England

Businesses and organizations

Companies
 X (company), previously "Google X"
 X, the stock symbol for United States Steel Corporation
 X.com, the original name of PayPal

Schools
 St. Francis Xavier University, in Antigonish, Nova Scotia
 The X, nickname for École Polytechnique, a French engineering school

Other organizations
 X (demo party), a Dutch demoscene party which started in 1995
 Organization X, a pro-royalist and anti-communist guerrilla group, active during the Axis occupation of Greece and the Greek Civil War

Language
 x, a symbol in the International Phonetic Alphabet for the voiceless velar fricative
 , a symbol in the International Phonetic Alphabet for the voiceless uvular fricative

People

In arts and entertainment
 Director X (born 1975), Canadian music video director also known as X and Little X
 Princess X (musician), former stage name of musician Liza Fox
 XXXTentacion (1998–2018), American rapper commonly referred to as "X"
 DMX (rapper) (1970–2021), American rapper commonly referred to as "X"
 Shaun Ryder (born 1962), English musician and singer–songwriter who sometimes uses the pseudonym X
 Terminator X (born 1966), stage name for American DJ Norman Roberts, who worked with Public Enemy
 X, ring name of wrestler Carl Ouellet (born 1967)

Other people
 Clyde X (1931–2009), Nation of Islam official
 Khoisan X (1955–2010), political activist
 Laura X (born 1940), feminist historian
 Malcolm X (1925–1965), civil rights activist
 Michael X (1933–1975), activist and criminal
 Xiuhtezcatl Martinez (born 2000), climate activist, often known as "X"
 X, the girl in the X Case, a landmark court case about abortion in Ireland
 X, the pseudonym under which the "X Article", formally titled "The Sources of Soviet Conduct", was published in Foreign Affairs magazine
 X, surname often assumed by members of the Nation of Islam

Science, technology, and mathematics

Astronomy
 X, signifying a comet of unknown orbit
 Galaxy X (galaxy), a postulated dark galaxy
 Planet X, a hypothesised planet in the outer solar system

Biology
 × (or x), in binomial nomenclature as part of a hybrid name in botany
 X chromosome, one of the two sex-determining chromosomes in many animal species, including mammals

Chemistry
 X, the pseudoelement symbol for a halogen or halide in organic chemistry; see Skeletal formula

Computing
 X (writing speed), the speed at which data is written to an optical disc
 OS X (pronounced 'OS ten'), the former name of the macOS operating system for Apple computers
 X Window System, a client-server display protocol often used in UNIX environments
 X file format, used by DirectX

Mathematics
 10 (number) (Roman numeral: X)
 Cross product or vector product (×)
 Multiplication sign (× or ✕)
 x, an axis in the Cartesian coordinate system
 x, a common variable for unknown or changing concepts in mathematics

Physics
 X (charge), a conserved quantum number in particle physics
 X band, part of the microwave band of the electromagnetic spectrum
 X unit (X), in physics

Other uses
 Generation X, the Western sociological generation born after Boomers or Jonesers and before Millennials
 iPhone X, a smartphone by Apple Inc
 HiPhi X, an electric crossover produced from 2020
 Tesla Model X, an electric crossover by Tesla
 X (automobile), a French car produced in 1908 and 1909
 X (gender identity), used on passports and identification documents to denote intersex or indeterminate gender
 X mark, a common written symbol of negation or affirmation
 X, the symbol for a strike in bowling
 X, a handwritten symbol for a kiss
 X, a street name for the drug MDMA
 X, often used by straight edgers to show their commitment to their lifestyle
 ╳, a box-drawing character
 Ⓧ, a typographical symbol in Japanese resale price maintenance
 X, sometimes used in acronyms and other abbreviations to represent the word "cross"
 X, the legal signature of an illiterate person
 X (fragrance), a fragrance set by Irish pop vocal band Westlife
 The X, the Xcel Energy Center, an arena in Saint Paul, Minnesota
 Nilgiri Mountain Railway X class
 a stand-in for the Greek letter Chi

See also
 X, sometimes used in acronyms and other abbreviations to represent the word "extended" or related
 X, sometimes used in acronyms and other abbreviations to represent the word "trans" or related
 X, sometimes used in acronyms and other abbreviations to represent the word "express" or related
 X² (roller coaster), the world's first fourth dimension coaster, at Six Flags Magic Mountain
 Citizen X (disambiguation)
 Doctor X (disambiguation)
 Double X (disambiguation)
 Ex (disambiguation)
 Galaxy X (disambiguation)
 Miss X (disambiguation)
 Mister X (disambiguation)
 Model X (disambiguation)
 Professor X (disambiguation)
 Project X (disambiguation)
 Racer X (disambiguation)
 System X (disambiguation)
 Triple X (disambiguation)
 X force (disambiguation)
 XX (disambiguation)
 XXX (disambiguation)
 XXXX (disambiguation)